Ione is a city in Morrow County, Oregon, United States. The population was 329 at the 2010 census. It is part of the Pendleton–Hermiston Micropolitan Statistical Area.

Geography

Willow Creek flows through Ione, which is downstream of Heppner and Lexington and upstream of Arlington.

Route 74 forms part of the Blue Mountain Scenic Byway, a  set of roads connecting I-84 along the Columbia River with the North Fork John Day River in the Blue Mountains. Part of the route follows the Willow Creek drainage through Ione.

Climate
This region experiences warm (but not hot) and dry summers, with no average monthly temperatures above .  According to the Köppen climate classification system, Ione has a warm-summer Mediterranean climate, Csb on climate maps.

History
In 1883, landowner E. G. Sperry named the community Ione after Ione Arthur, a girl who was visiting the Sperrys with her family. Aaron Royse managed the first store in Ione, and he became the first postmaster when an Ione post office was established in 1884.

Sheep ranching was important in the region during the days of early settlement by non-natives. It continues in the 21st century and has been joined by wheat farming and cattle ranching as significant uses of the land.

Demographics

2010 census
As of the census of 2010, there were 329 people, 132 households, and 90 families residing in the city. The racial makeup of the city was 86.6% White, 0.9% Native American, 0.6% Asian, 8.2% from other races, and 3.6% from two or more races. Hispanic or Latino of any race were 11.9% of the population.

There were 132 households, of which 34.8% had children under the age of 18 living with them, 61.4% were married couples living together, 3.0% had a female householder with no husband present, 3.8% had a male householder with no wife present, and 31.8% were non-families. 24.2% of all households were made up of individuals, and 12.9% had someone living alone who was 65 years of age or older. The average household size was 2.49 and the average family size was 3.03.

The median age in the city was 42.3 years. 24.6% of residents were under the age of 18; 8.9% were between the ages of 18 and 24; 19.4% were from 25 to 44; 32.5% were from 45 to 64; and 14.6% were 65 years of age or older. The gender makeup of the city was 52.0% male and 48.0% female.

2000 census
As of the census of 2000, there were 321 people, 127 households, and 86 families residing in the city. The population density was 551.8 people per square mile (213.7/km2). There were 142 housing units at an average density of 244.1 per square mile (94.5/km2). The racial makeup of the city was 97.82% White, and 2.18% from two or more races. Hispanic or Latino of any race were 3.12% of the population.

There were 127 households, out of which 32.3% had children under the age of 18 living with them, 59.1% were married couples living together, 6.3% had a female householder with no husband present, and 31.5% were non-families. 29.1% of all households were made up of individuals, and 10.2% had someone living alone who was 65 years of age or older. The average household size was 2.53 and the average family size was 3.09.

In the city, the population was spread out, with 28.3% under the age of 18, 5.6% from 18 to 24, 29.6% from 25 to 44, 20.6% from 45 to 64, and 15.9% who were 65 years of age or older. The median age was 38 years. For every 100 females, there were 112.6 males. For every 100 females age 18 and over, there were 111.0 males.

The median income for a household in the city was $37,500, and the median income for a family was $43,750. Males had a median income of $32,143 versus $21,250 for females. The per capita income for the city was $14,531. About 5.8% of families and 6.2% of the population were below the poverty line, including 5.3% of those under age 18 and 9.7% of those age 65 or over.

Economy and education
Ione Community Charter School, serving about 200 students in grades kindergarten through 12, is in Ione. Formerly part of the Morrow County School District, the school is in the Ione School District, with headquarters in Ione.

As of 2002, the top employers for Ione were the Ione Community School and—all in Heppner—the Columbia Basin Electric Co-op, Miller & Sons Welding, and the Heppner Gazette-Times (a weekly newspaper).

References

External links
 Entry for Ione in the Oregon Blue Book

Cities in Oregon
Cities in Morrow County, Oregon
Pendleton–Hermiston Micropolitan Statistical Area